Ammar Kamaleldin Taifour (born 12 April 1997) is a footballer who plays as a midfielder for Al-Merrikh. Born in the United States, he represents Sudan internationally.

Career

Club career

In 2019, he signed for Italian side Bastia (Italy). In 2020, Taifour signed for Al-Merrikh in Sudan.

International career

He is eligible to represent the United States internationally, having been born there.

References

External links
 

Sudanese footballers
American soccer players
Association football midfielders
Expatriate footballers in Italy
Living people
Sudan international footballers
Serie D players
Al-Merrikh SC players
American people of Sudanese descent
1997 births
Sudan A' international footballers
2022 African Nations Championship players
American expatriate sportspeople in Italy
American expatriate soccer players
Sudanese expatriate sportspeople in Italy
Sudanese expatriate footballers